CRRC Changchun Railway Vehicles Co., Ltd. is a Chinese rolling stock manufacturer and a division of the CRRC. While the CRV emerged in 2002, the company's roots date back to the establishment of the Changchun Car Company in 1954. The company became a division of CNR Corporation before its merger with CSR to form the present CRRC. It has produced a variety of rolling stock for customers in China and abroad, including locomotives, passenger cars, multiple units, rapid transit and light rail vehicles. It has established technology transfer partnerships with several foreign railcar manufacturers, including Bombardier Transportation, Alstom, and Siemens Mobility.

Joint Ventures
In 2004 Alstom won the first high speed train contract in China, supporting CRRC to build 60 CRH5 high speed trains.

In November 2016, CRRC won Melbourne suburban train contract for Evolution Rail as Public Private Partnership with Downer Group, Plenary Group.

Changchun Bombardier Railway Vehicles Co. Ltd. (CBRC)
In 1996, CRRC and Adtranz (later Bombardier Transportation) established a joint venture. CRRC has built cars for Shanghai Metro, Guangzhou Metro and Shenzhen Metro since 2000.

Clients and products

Domestic
 China Railway
 Type 25Z AC high-speed passenger cars
 NZJ2 "Shenzhou" Double Deck DMU
 "Jinlun" Double Deck DMU
 SYZ25 “Lushan” Double-deck DMU
 Type SYZ25B AC Double Deck Coach
 China Railways CRH3 High Speed Trains - with Tangshan Railway Vehicle and based on the Siemens Velaro platform
 China Railways CRH5 High Speed Trains - based on Alstom's New Pendolino ETR-600
 China Railways CRHCJ-1
 CR400BF
 China Railways CRHCJ-5
 Beijing Subway (Line 1, Line 2, Line 5, Line 6, Line 9, Line 10, Line 13, Line 14, Line 15, Line 16, Yizhuang line, Fangshan line, Yanfang line and Airport Express)
 Tianjin Metro (Line 1, Line 9)
 Shenzhen Metro (Line 1, Line 2, Line 3, Line 5, Line 7, Line 9) licensed from Bombardier Transportation
 Chongqing Rail Transit
 monorail cars for Line 2 and Line 3 with Hitachi
 heavy-rail cars for Line 1 & Line 6
 Guangzhou Metro - Movia metro cars licensed from Bombardier Transportation
 Wuhan Metro Type B cars (Line 1, Line 2, Line 3)
 Optics Valley Traffic System LRV in Wuhan - 100 cars
 Shanghai Metro (Line 3, Line 4, Line 6, Line 7, Line 8, Line 9, Line 12, Line 17) licensed from Bombardier Transportation
 Changchun Rail Transit heavy-rail cars
 Shenyang Metro (Line 1)
 Shenyang Modern Tram
 Guangfo Metro (Line 1)
 Xi'an Metro (Line 2)
 Harbin Metro
 Nanchang Metro (Line 1, Line 2)
 Chengdu Metro (Line 3, Line 4)
 Lanzhou Metro (Line 1)

Export
 Pyongyang Metro (North Korea) - DK4 [archived]
 Tehran Metro (Iran) - Line 1 and Line 4
 Colombia: Teamed with Bombardier to supply metro cars and equipment to  Bogotá Metro
 Passenger cars for Sri Lanka
 BTS Skytrain
 Silom line 17 4-car sets (Bangkok, Thailand)
 Sukhumvit line 24 4-car sets for the north extensions in Sukhumvit Line (Bangkok, Thailand)
 Mashhad Light Rail (Iran)
 Mecca Metro and Al Mashaaer Al Mugaddassah Metro Southern Line (Saudi Arabia)
 Hong Kong MTR
 Urban Lines C-train (8-car sets for Kwun Tong line, 3-car variant for South Island line)
 TML C-train (8-car sets for Tuen Ma line)
 Passenger cars for Argentina
 Sydney Trains (Australia) - A & B-set double-deck EMUs (final assembly by Downer Rail's Cardiff Locomotive Workshops)
 Rio de Janeiro Metro (Brazil) - Line 1A metro cars
 SuperVia (Rio de Janeiro, Brazil) - Commuter EMUs
 Buenos Aires Underground (Argentina) - Buenos Aires Underground 200 Series for Line A
 Addis Ababa Light Rail (Ethiopia)
 The following are built at the Springfield, Massachusetts factory:
 Red and Orange line cars for the Massachusetts Bay Transportation Authority (MBTA)
 Double-deck car for SEPTA Southeastern Pennsylvania Transportation Authority
 HR4000 cars for Los Angeles Metro Rail B and D lines
 Tel Aviv (Israel) - Red Line for NTA
 Metro Trains Melbourne (Australia) - High Capacity Metro Trains (final assembly at Newport Workshops, Melbourne)
 Double-deck passenger cars for Iran
 Passenger cars for Pakistan
 Passenger cars for Bangladesh
 KiwiRail (New Zealand) - 50 passenger car bogies
 MRT (Singapore) 
Bombardier Movia C951/C951A cars for Downtown line with Bombardier Transportation (owned by Land Transport Authority and operated by SBS Transit)
Alstom Movia R151 cars for North South line & East West line with Alstom, initially Bombardier (owned by Land Transport Authority and operated by SMRT Trains)
 Express Rail Link (Malaysia)
 2 trainsets of 4-car CRRC Equator EMU for KLIA Ekspres
 4 trainsets of 4-car CRRC Equator EMU for KLIA Transit

References

Literature

External links

 

CRRC Group
Government-owned companies of China
Manufacturing companies established in 1954
Changchun Railway Vehicles
Companies based in Changchun
Chinese brands
1954 establishments in China
Rolling stock manufacturers of China
Chinese companies established in 1954